The 2021 Grand Prix du Morbihan was the 44th edition of the Grand Prix du Morbihan, a one-day road cycling race held on 16 October 2021 in and around Grand-Champ, Morbihan, in the Brittany region of northwestern France. This edition was the race's first in the UCI ProSeries; the 2020 edition was expected to feature in the inaugural UCI ProSeries but was cancelled due to the COVID-19 pandemic. It was also the fifteenth and penultimate event of the 2021 French Road Cycling Cup. The race was originally due to be held on 15 May but was postponed by COVID-19 precautions.

The  race began in Grand-Champ and headed southeast through the Regional Natural Park of the Gulf of Morbihan, passing through the towns of Saint-Avé, Treffléan, and Theix-Noyalo en route to the southernmost point of the race near Surzur.

Teams 
Three of the 19 UCI WorldTeams, seven UCI ProTeams, five UCI Continental teams, and the French national team made up the 16 teams that participated in the race. UCI ProTeam  was also expected to participate, but the team ceased operations with immediate effect on 11 October due to financial problems. In total, 103 riders started the race, of which 85 finished.

UCI WorldTeams

 
 
 

UCI ProTeams

 
 
 
 
 
 
 

UCI Continental Teams

 
 
 
 
 

National Teams

 France

Result

References

Sources

External links 
  

Grand Prix du Morbihan
Grand Prix du Morbihan
Grand Prix du Morbihan
Grand Prix du Morbihan